The 2012–13 Auburn Tigers men's basketball team represent the University of Auburn in the 2012–13 college basketball season. The team's head coach is Tony Barbee, in his third season at Auburn. The team plays their home games at the Auburn Arena in Auburn, Alabama as a member of the Southeastern Conference.

Roster

Schedule and results

|-
!colspan=12| Exhibition

|-
!colspan=12| Non-Conference Regular Season

|-
!colspan=12| SEC Regular Season

|-
!colspan=12| 2013 SEC tournament

|-
| colspan="12" | *Non-Conference Game. Rankings from AP poll. All times are in Central Time.
|}

References

Auburn Tigers men's basketball seasons
Auburn
Auburn
Auburn